The REO Speed Wagon (alternatively Reo Speedwagon) was a light motor truck model manufactured by REO Motor Car Company. It is an ancestor of the pickup truck.

First introduced in 1915, production continued through at least 1953, and made REO (the initials of its founder, Ransom Eli Olds) one of the better-known manufacturers of commercial vehicles in America prior to World War II. Although the basic design and styling of the chassis remained consistent, the Speed Wagon was manufactured in a variety of configurations (pickup and panel truck, passenger bus) to serve as delivery, tow, dump, and fire trucks, as well as hearses and ambulances. Other manufacturers provided refits for adapting the Speed Wagon for specialized purposes. The Speed Wagon used REO's "Gold Crown" series of engines, and was well regarded for power, durability, and quality.

While REO produced some wagons based on its automobile chassis (the Model H) starting in 1908 and had organized a division to produce trucks in 1910 with success, the Speed Wagon's introduction in 1915 was a significant step and a sales success. The company was soon offering a variety of Speed Wagon models with many options, and by 1925 had produced 125,000.

After years of roughly equal car and truck emphasis, REO shifted its focus completely to trucks, ending automobile production in 1936. Production for the civilian market was suspended during World War II, resuming in 1946. In 1967, Diamond T and Reo Trucks were combined to form the Diamond Reo Trucks Division of the White Motor Corporation.

The rock and roll quintet REO Speedwagon took its name from this vehicle, which was, in turn, later adapted into a main character in JoJo's Bizarre Adventure.

Models 
 1915 model featured 1-ton weight, four-cylinder engine, three speed transmission and aimed to be faster than the  average speed of contemporary trucks.
 1917 model featured 3.25-ton weight and canvas top and sides and cost $1125.
 1925 model featured six-cylinder engine
 1933 Model BN  featured REO's six-cylinder "Gold Crown" engine and combination of parts from the company's Flying Cloud and Royale luxury cars. It is a rare, relatively fast panel delivery truck with wooden body.

References

External links

 Reo Speed Wagon Camper on display at Woodland Auto Display, Paso Robles, CA
 montage of light delivery trucks including early model Reo Speed Wagon
 1924 Speed Wagon print advertisement
 1925 Speed Wagon print advertisement
 1928 Reo Speed Wagon print advertisement from Finland emphasizing the advantages of truck engines used in the Speed Wagon over engines from passenger cars.
 1936 REO Speedwagon print advertisement
 Iowa 80 Trucking Museum

Pickup trucks
Vehicles built in Lansing, Michigan